Puccinellia fasciculata, or Borrer's saltmarsh grass, is an annual grass native to coasts of Europe and introduced to the northern east coast of North America. Its diploid number is 28.

Description
The palea are shorter, oblong, and erose at their tip. The grass flowers from May to July.

Previously included in Puccinellia distans, P. fasciculata differs in its stouter and stiffer culms, being ascending or erect rather than decumbent as in P. distans. Its panicles are smaller and more narrow, its floral branches are floriferous nearly to their base, and its spikelets are more crowded and more coriaceous than in P. distans.

Habitat and distribution
Puccinellia fasciculata prefers sandy and saline seashores from Nova Scotia to Virginia in North America, though it is native to Europe. It can also be found at a few individual sites in Arizona, Utah, and Nevada. All occurrences of the species in North America are likely introductions of the species to the region by humans.

References

fasciculata
Plants described in 1908
Flora of Malta